"Just as Long as We're Together" was Prince's second single released from his 1978 debut album For You. The coda is an instrumental track originally called "Jelly Jam" that was added to the main track, and modified over time to blend into it.

The B-side of the track was the album track, "In Love". The single peaked at #91 on the R&B charts and did not enter the pop charts.

Track listings
7" single
 A. "Just as Long as We're Together" (Edit) – 3:25
 B. "In Love" – 3:38

7" promo
 A. "Just as Long as We're Together" (mono edit) – 3:25
 B. "Just as Long as We're Together" (stereo edit) – 3:25

12" promo
 A. "Just as Long as We're Together" (Disco Mix) – 6:29
 B. "Soft and Wet" (Disco Mix) – 3:02

Chart performance

References

Prince (musician) songs
1978 singles
Song recordings produced by Prince (musician)
Warner Records singles
1977 songs
Songs written by Prince (musician)